The MTV-1 Micro TV was the second model of a near pocket-sized television. The first was the Panasonic IC model TR-001 introduced in 1970. The MTV-1 was developed by Clive Sinclair (Sinclair Radionics Ltd). It was shown to the public at trade shows in London and Chicago in January, 1977, and released for sale in 1978.

The MTV-1 used a German AEG Telefunken  black-and-white, electrostatic deflection cathode ray tube (CRT) and included a rechargeable 4-AA-cell NiCad battery pack. It was able to receive either PAL or NTSC transmissions on VHF or UHF. A Welsh company, Wolsey Electronics, manufactured it for Sinclair. Custom ICs made by Texas Instruments and Sinclair contributed to its small size and low power consumption.

The original MTV-1 was the world's first multistandard TV, being capable of switching between PAL and NTSC.

References

Sources 
 Retro thing

External links 
 Franks Handheld TV Pages-Part 2
 Franks Handheld TV Pages-Internal Pictures

Products introduced in 1978
Sinclair Radionics
Mobile technology
Portable electronics
Television technology
Television sets